Gelan Daraq, also rendered as Kalan Daraq or Kolandaraq or Kulan Daraq, may refer to:
 Gelan Daraq-e Sofla